Xavier Vilalta (born May 8, 1980) is a Spanish architect and professor. He studied architecture in Barcelona, London, and the Illinois Institute of Technology in Chicago.

Vilalta combines practice with teaching and lecturing in cultural institutions and venues. He has taught as a professor at Barcelona Tech ETSAB and the University of Lleida.

In 2004 he founded the design firm Vilalta Studio in Barcelona, Spain. With his team, Vilalta developed his early work in Spain followed by international projects in emerging countries in Africa and the Middle East.

His projects have been recognized by international awards such as the Young Architect of the year at the Leaf Awards 2008, and two consecutive awards, 2009 and 2010, the SAIE Selection of the energy exhibition of Bologna in Italy for the sustainability of his projects. In 2011, he became a Fellow of TED (Technology, Entertainment, Design).

Design vision
Xavier Vilalta's work focuses on nature and people as well as how to reconnect the two thinking about our contemporary urban life as part of the environment where Architecture grows from the local natural conditions and traditions.

He is interested in vernacular architecture related to sustainability. He defines sustainability as the relationship between Architecture and the program it contains and its social values, the way it is designed and built and how it will perform in the future.

Awards
Recognitions
 2007 - Selected building for the Lleida Architecture Awards 2005-2007: Municipal Kindergarten in Mollerussa, Spain
 2008 - 1st prize : Leaf Awards 2008 for Arreletes Day-Care Centre, Els Alamús, Lleida, Spain in the category of young architect
 2009 - 3r prize: International Competition: SAIE Selection 09 in BolognaFiere  - 11 Urban Houses project.
 2010 - Selected building for the Lleida Architecture Awards 2007-2009: Arreletes Day-Care Centre, Els Alamús, Lleida, Spain
 2010 - 1st prize : International Competition: SAIE Selection 10 in BolognaFiere  - Melaku Center
 2011 - TED Fellowship 2011
 2013 - International Cooperation Award: Woldya Maternity, Ethiopia - Catalan Architects Association - COAC
 2013 - Honorable Mention - MA Prize 13 - Modern Atlanta
 2016 - Archdaily 1 of 10 Best Architecture projects of 2016 - Lideta Mercato Shopping mall 
 2017 - Archdaily Building of the year 2017 - Shortlisted - Lideta Mercato Shopping mall 
 2017 - Prix Versailles - UNESCO - World winner - Special prize exterior design - Lideta Mercato Shopping mall Prix Versailles

Competitions
 2004 - Finalist International Competition: La Encarnación market, square and museum in Seville, Spain.
 2006 - 1st prize National Competition for technology innovation for residential construction: 44 dwellings for young people in Sant Vicenç dels Horts, Barcelona, Spain.
 2006 - 1st prize: Competition Municipal Kindergarten in Mollerussa, Spain
 2008 - 2nd prize competition: “Onze de Setembre” Primary Care Center in Lleida, Spain
 2010 - 1st prize: International Restricted Competition: Alpha Project, Doha, Qatar
 2010 - Shortlisted: International Competition for New Angola University
 2010 - 1st prize: Competition for New Lideta Shopping Center in Ethiopia
 2012 - 2nd prize: Competition for the new United Bank Headquarters in Ethiopia

Main projects
 Arreletes Day Care Center - Spain
 El Niu Kindergarten - Spain
 Pla d'Urgell Morgue - Spain
 Pro House - Spain
 Melaku Center - Ethiopia
 Alpha Project - Qatar
 Central Highlands University - Angola
 Lideta Mercato - Ethiopia
 Barcelona Ecological Center - Spain
 Ayertena Mall - Ethiopia 
 Urban Gardens - Qatar
 Woldya Maternity - Ethiopia
 Cite de Mongamu - DR of the Congo

Articles
 From Bullfighting to Eco-Leisure: Spain's Big Shift
 A city should look into itself before it’s too late
  Plaza de toros Monumental de Barcelona (Future of Monumental Plaza in Barcelona)
 Three creative ideas to light up the world

References

Architects from Catalonia
Living people
1980 births